The Ben Hatskin Trophy was presented annually to the World Hockey Association's best goaltender. 

It was named in honour of Ben Hatskin, who founded the Winnipeg Jets.

Ben Hatskin Trophy winners were:

1973 – Gerry Cheevers, Cleveland Crusaders
1974 – Don McLeod, Houston Aeros
1975 – Ron Grahame, Houston Aeros
1976 – Michel Dion, Indianapolis Racers
1977 – Ron Grahame, Houston Aeros
1978 – Al Smith, New England Whalers
1979 – Dave Dryden, Edmonton Oilers

Sources

https://www.hockey-reference.com/awards/hatskin.html

https://www.classicauctions.net/gerry_cheevers__1972_73_cleveland_crusaders__ben_h-lot133567.aspx

World Hockey Association trophies and awards